Shewanella fodinae is a Gram-negative and motile bacterium from the genus of Shewanella which has been isolated from a coal mine in India.

References

External links
Type strain of Shewanella fodinae at BacDive -  the Bacterial Diversity Metadatabase

Alteromonadales
Bacteria described in 2010